As the Earth Turns is a 1938 American independent science-fiction silent film directed by Richard Lyford. Lyford was 20 years old when he directed As the Earth Turns and the film is one of many avant-garde films that he made in Seattle, Washington, before finding success with Walt Disney in the 1940s.

Summary
He portrays a central character in the film, Pax, "who attempts to persuade the world to put down its weapons by inducing extreme climate change".

Rediscovery
Like most of Lyford's early films, it was presumed lost until it was discovered in his former Seattle home over 80 years later. KING-TV reported that the film may have never left Lyford's basement, which he would use as an auditorium to show his films. After the rediscovery, Lyford's family asked Seattle composer Ed Hartman to create a score for the film. As the Earth Turns made its theatrical premiere at the Seattle International Film Festival in 2019. LA Weekly wrote that by October 2019, the rediscovered film "played at over 100 film festivals worldwide and garnered many awards along the way". It made its television debut on Turner Classic Movies on October 31, 2021.

References

External links
 Official website
 
 
 As the Earth Turns at the Seattle International Film Festival

1930s rediscovered films
1930s science fiction films
1938 films
American black-and-white films
American silent feature films
Climate change films
Films directed by Richard Lyford
Films shot in Seattle
Mad scientist films
Rediscovered American films
1930s American films
Silent horror films
1930s independent films
American independent films
1930s avant-garde and experimental films
Surviving American silent films